Alpine Skiing at the 1992 Winter Olympics at Albertville, France, consisted of ten alpine skiing events, held 9–22 February. The men's races were held at Val d’Isère, except for the slalom, which was at Les Menuires. All five women's events were conducted at Méribel.

Medal summary
Twelve nations won medals in Alpine skiing, with Austria leading the medal table with eight (3 gold, 2 silver, and 3 bronze). Petra Kronberger of Austria led the individual medal table with two gold medals, while Alberto Tomba of Italy was the most successful male skier with two medals, one gold and one silver.

Marc Girardelli's two silver medals were the first won for Luxembourg in the Winter Olympics, and made him its most  successful Olympic athlete to date. Annelise Coberger's silver medal in the women's slalom was New Zealand's first, and through 2014, only Winter Olympic medal. Norway's four medals were its first in alpine skiing in 40 years, since 1952 in Oslo.

Medal table

Source:

Men's events

Source:

Women's events

Source:

Course information

Source:

Participating nations
Fifty nations sent alpine skiers to compete in the events in Albertville. Algeria, Brazil, Croatia, Denmark, North Korea, Slovenia, Swaziland and the Unified Team (athletes from the former Soviet Union) made their Olympic alpine skiing debuts. Germany competed as one team for the first time since 1964. Below is a list of the competing nations; in parentheses are the number of national competitors.

References

External links
FIS-Ski.com – alpine skiing – 1992 Winter Olympics – Albertville, France
Winter Map - Val-d'Isere
Winter Map - Méribel

 
1992 Winter Olympics events
Alpine skiing at the Winter Olympics
Winter Olympics
Alpine skiing competitions in France